New Wet Kojak was an American indie rock band from New York City.

The group was formed when two members of Girls Against Boys, Scott McCloud and Johnny Temple, joined three other former residents of Washington, D.C., Geoff Turner (ex-Gray Matter), Nick Pellicciotto (ex-Edsel), and Charles Bennington (ex-High Back Chairs). The group released four full-length albums and an EP between 1995 and 2003 on the Touch and Go and the Beggars Banquet record labels.

Members
Scott McCloud - vocals
Johnny Temple - bass
Geoff Turner - guitar
Nick Pellicciotto - drums
Charles Bennington - saxophone

Discography
New Wet Kojak (Touch and Go, 1995)
Nasty International (Touch and Go, 1997)
Do Things (Beggars Banquet, 2000)
No. 4 EP (Beggars Banquet, 2001)
This Is the Glamorous (Beggars Banquet, 2003)

References

External links 
 nwk.wgns.com site
 New Wet Kojak site on WGNS
 
 

Indie rock musical groups from New York (state)
Musical groups from New York City
Touch and Go Records artists